The coat of arms of Haiti is the national coat of arms of the Republic of Haiti. It was originally introduced in 1807, and it has appeared in its current form since 1986. Since this Haitian national symbol does not conform to the rules of heraldry for a traditional coat of arms, then it could be considered a national emblem instead (national emblem of Haiti).

Overview
It has six draped flags of the country, three on each side, which are located behind a palm tree and cannons on a green lawn. Upon the lawn are various items, including a drum, bugles, cannonballs and ship anchors. Above the palm tree, there is a liberty cap placed as a symbol of freedom.

The ribbon bears the motto , which is also the motto of several other countries. This should not be confused with the national motto of Haiti, which according to the Constitution of Haiti is Liberté, égalité, fraternité (French for 'Liberty, Equality, Fraternity').

History
The oldest use of a symbol for Haiti is known since 1807. The symbol shows several national flags, with two cannons and palm trees. The symbol indicates the battle for independence of the republic. The motto, in French, means 'Strength through unity'. The use of the symbol was interrupted twice; once was during the period of Henri I. The then president Henri Christophe declared himself as the King of Haiti and adopted a Royal Coat of Arms. On the yellow shield of the arm there was a phoenix rising from its flames with five-pointed stars around it, and the motto  (I will rise in my ashes) inscribed on a ribbon outlining the shield. Two royally crowned lions supported both sides of the shield, and the motto  (God, my cause and my sword) was placed on another ribbon at the bottom. In 1814 Henri I slightly changed his Royal Arm, the lions were removed and the motto was changed to a Latin one:  (Reborn from the ashes). Another change occurred in 1849, when President General Faustin Soulouque crowned himself as Emperor Faustin I. He adopted new Imperial arms, showing two cannons and a French imperial eagle. Two lions were again used as supporters and the whole was placed in a purple mantle, with a motto similar to the one Henri I used:  (God, my country and my sword). The emperor was forced to leave the country in 1859, and the old symbol was later restored. Ever since the composition has been the same, but the colors and items have changed somewhat.

The coat of arms is on the national flag of Haiti, but not on its civil flag.

Historical coats of arms

See also
 Flag of Haiti
 Seal and emblem of the United States Department of the Army

Notes 

National symbols of Haiti
Haiti
Haitian coats of arms
Haiti
Haiti
Haiti
Haiti
Haiti
Haiti
Haiti
Coats of arms with horns (instrument)